The Hidden is a 2005 psychological thriller film directed by Antonio Hernández from a screenplay by Hernández and Enrique Brasó which stars Laia Marull, Leonardo Sbaraglia, and Angie Cepeda. It is a Spanish-British-Italian co-production.

Plot 
Natalia is obssessed by a monolith appearing in her dreams. Upon meeting in a lecture on dream interpretation, she comes across Beatriz (a woman with tattoos similar to the inscriptions on the monolith and who actually has a secret plan of revenge against Natalia), and Álex, a man who starts to fall romantically for both of them.

Cast

Production 
Antonio Hernández and  took over writing duties. The film was produced by Icónica and Zebra Producciones, alongside Italy's Sintra Films and UK's Future Films. Shooting locations included Madrid.  worked as cinematographer.

Release 
The film was presented at the Sitges Film Festival on 15 October 2005. Distributed by Warner Sogefilms, it was released theatrically in Spain on 4 November 2005.

See also 
 List of Spanish films of 2005

References 

Spanish psychological thriller films
British psychological thriller films
Italian psychological thriller films
2000s psychological thriller films
Films shot in Madrid
Films about dreams
2000s Spanish-language films